Islip railway station serves the village of Islip, Oxfordshire, England. Islip is north-east of Oxford. The station is currently managed by Chiltern Railways.

History

On 1 October 1850 the Buckinghamshire Railway opened Islip station as a double tracked two-platform station with a goods shed.

In 1987 Network SouthEast reintroduced passenger services on the Oxford to Bicester Line and on 13 May 1989 Islip was reopened as a single platform unstaffed halt.

The station closed to rail traffic on 15 February 2014 (the last trains having run late on 14 February) in order to allow upgrade of the line between Oxford and Bicester. Reopening was planned for May 2015, but was later delayed until 26 October 2015.

Services

From December 2008 the service on Mondays to Saturdays was improved with an evening service and a doubling of the service on Saturdays. There were 11 trains on Mondays to Thursdays, 12 on Fridays and 13 on Saturdays. From May 2009 further improvements saw extra trains during the daytime on Mondays to Fridays and a new all-year round Sunday service, with trains every 90 minutes.

On 22 May 2011 Chiltern Railways took over all passenger operations from this station from the previous operator First Great Western. This was in advance of the new London Marylebone to Oxford service which was due to start in 2013, but was later delayed to 26 October 2015.

The station will have a car park with 26 standard car spaces plus two for passengers with reduced mobility. It will also have parking for 10 pedal cycles.

References

External links

 East West Rail Link support group
 East West Rail consortium
 Chiltern Railways Evergreen 3 project

Railway stations in Oxfordshire
DfT Category F2 stations
Former London and North Western Railway stations
1850 establishments in England
Railway stations in Great Britain opened in 1850
Railway stations in Great Britain closed in 1968
1989 establishments in England
Railway stations in Great Britain opened in 1989
Railway stations in Great Britain closed in 2014
Railway stations served by Chiltern Railways
Railway stations in Great Britain opened in 2015
Reopened railway stations in Great Britain
East West Rail